Yamagola Malli Modalayindi is a 2007 Indian Telugu socio-fantasy film directed by Srinivasa Reddy. Srikanth, Venu Thottempudi, Meera Jasmine and Reema Sen play the lead roles. Srinivasa Reddy, Srikanth and Meera Jasmine collaborated again for A Aa E Ee (2009).

Plot
A baby girl is born into a rich family. Astrologers predict that she will become a noble woman with a good heart who is socially committed towards the suffering of others. They also say that the girl's family will become richer. She is named Aishwarya (Meera Jasmine). But it is written in Yamaloka that the girl would die at a young age.

Running parallel to this story, at Yamaloka, an aging Yamadharmaraja (Satyanarayana) wants to take rest, for which he proposes to throne his grandson Dharma Raju (Srikanth). Aging Chitragupta (Allu Ramalingiah, graphical presentation) will take rest, prompting his brother Vichitragupta (AVS) to do his duties temporarily. Hence, grandson of Chitragupta (Venu) gets ready to replace the old man.

Yama wants to test the talent of the young guys (who are shown as buddies). They are sent to earth to take the life of Aishwarya. Young Yama falls in love with her. His buddy also falls in love with a police officer Vaijayanti (Reema Sen). The love factor brings disrepute to Yama. But, finally the mortal love wins over Yamadharma.

Cast

 Srikanth as Dharma Raju, grandson of Yamadharmaraja.
 Venu Thottempudi as Gupta, grandson of Chitra gupta.
 Meera Jasmine as Aishwarya
 Reema Sen as Vaijayanti
 Allu Ramalingaiah as Chitragupta (graphics)
 Kaikala Satyanarayana as Yamadharmaraja, Pedda Yamudu
 Chalapathi Rao as Indra
 Krishna Bhagvaan as Naradha
 Rajeev Kanakala as Thief
 Hema
 Kavitha
 V.K.Naresh as Aishwarya's Father
 Pragathi Aishwarya's mother
 Sivaji Raja
 L. B. Sriram as Vaijayanti's Father
 Rajitha
 Bianca Desai as Menaka

Dubbing version
This film has been dubbed in Tamil with the title Indhiraloga Ilavarasan and in Malayalam with the title Indralokathe Rajakumari.

References

External links

Indian fantasy films
2000s Telugu-language films